Blossom Dearie Sings Comden and Green is a 1959 album by Blossom Dearie, focusing on the work of lyricists Betty Comden and Adolph Green.

Track listing
"Lucky to Be Me" (Leonard Bernstein) – 4:02
"Just in Time" (Jule Styne) – 3:33
"Some Other Time" (Bernstein) – 3:57
"Dance Only with Me" (Styne) – 2:58
"I Like Myself" (André Previn) – 3:31
"The Party's Over" (Styne) – 4:22
"How Will He Know" (Styne) – 2:54
"It's Love" (Bernstein) – 2:50
"Hold Me, Hold Me, Hold Me" (Styne) – 3:25
"Lonely Town" (Bernstein) – 3:33

All lyrics by Betty Comden and Adolph Green, composers indicated.

Personnel
Blossom Dearie – vocal, piano
Kenny Burrell – guitar
Ray Brown – double bass
Ed Thigpen – drums

References

1959 albums
Blossom Dearie albums
Verve Records albums
Albums produced by Norman Granz
Albums produced by Blossom Dearie